Laurinavičius is a Lithuanian language surname. Like many Lithuanian last names, due to historical reasons, it possesses a Slavicized ending -ičius and is related to Lithuanian last names Laurinaitis, Laurinkus, which are considered to be in true Lithuanian form.

The surname may refer to:
Česlovas Laurinavičius, Lithuanian historian and politologist
Bronius Laurinavičius, Lithuanian priest, Soviet dissident
Elena Laurinavičienė, a Lithuanian Righteous Among the Nations

Lithuanian-language surnames